Chowk Yadgar (“Memorial Square”), formerly Hasting’s Memorial, is a famous landmark in the old walled city of Peshawar. It is located at the convergence point of different major roads and bazaars of the old city.

History

The first “Dome Shaped” monument at this square was originally erected in the memory of Colonel C. Hastings in 1883.

Location

To the West of Chowk Yadgar is the end of “Ander Shehr Street” (meaning “inside of the city”) or “Jewelers street”. The Jewelers Street starts from the “Naz Cinema Road” (right in front of Forward High School) and culminates at Chowk Yadgar.
Going eastwards from chowk yadgar is the famous Ghanta Ghar or clock tower in the city.
On the south is located bazar -e - abresham garan or the shawls market. and on the north of is ashraf road peshawr a busy place for traders

References

External links
History of Chowk Yadgar

Tourist attractions in Peshawar